The economy of Illinois is the fifth largest by GDP in the United States and one of the most diversified economies in the world. Fueled by the economy of Chicago, the Chicago metropolitan area is home to many of the United States' largest companies, including Abbott Laboratories, AbbVie Inc., Allstate, Baxter International, Conagra, Crate and Barrel, Kraft Heinz, McDonald's, CNH Industrial, GE Healthcare, Aon PLC, Willis Towers Watson, Mondelez International, Motorola, United Airlines, US Foods, Walgreens, and more. The Chicago area is a global financial center and headquarters a wide variety of financial institutions including Citadel LLC, CNA Financial, Discover Financial Services, Morningstar, Inc., Nuveen, and more. Chicago is also home to the largest futures exchange in the world, the Chicago Mercantile Exchange.

Across the state, other Fortune 500 world headquarters based in Illinois include State Farm in Bloomington and John Deere in Moline. As of 2017, Illinois ranked fourth in the nation for the most Fortune 500 based companies with a total of 36. For six consecutive years, Chicagoland was ranked the nation's top metropolitan area for corporate relocations.

The 2018 total gross state product for Illinois was $857 billion, placing it fifth in the nation. The 2017 median household income was $62,992, one of the nation's highest. In 2016, the nine counties of the Chicago metropolitan area accounted for 77.3% of the state's total wages, with the remaining 93 counties at 22.7%. The state's industrial outputs include machinery, food processing, electrical equipment, chemical products, publishing, fabricated metal products and transportation equipment. Corn and soybeans are important agricultural products. Service industries of note are financial trading, higher education, logistics, and medicine.

Agriculture
Most of the state of Illinois lies outside the Chicago metropolitan area and inside the North American Corn Belt. Corn, soybeans, and other large-field crops are grown extensively. These crops and their products account for much of the state's economic output outside Chicago. Much of the field crop is remanufactured into feed for hogs and cattle. Dairy products and wheat are important secondary crops in specific segments of the state. 
In addition, some Illinois farmers grow specialty crops such as popcorn and pumpkins. The state is the largest producer of pumpkins among the U.S. states. There is a large watermelon growing area centered on Lincoln, Illinois. Illinois wine is a growing industry. In December 2006, the Shawnee Hills were named Illinois's first American Viticultural Area (AVA).

Manufacturing
Manufacturing in Illinois accounts for 14% of the state's total output and generates $101 billion in economic activity. Illinois's manufacturing sector grew out of its agricultural production. A key piece of infrastructure for several generations was the Union Stock Yards of Chicago, which from 1865 until 1971 penned and slaughtered millions of cattle and hogs into standardized cuts of beef and pork.

In 1893 Illinois manufacturers formed the Illinois Manufacturers' Association in opposition to the Sweatshop Law of 1893 that prohibited child labor and mandated an eight-hour workday. Governor Peter Altgeld had made Florence Kelley the Chief Factory Inspector for the state of Illinois. The association sponsored a number of cases which led to the Illinois Supreme Court finding that Section 5 of the Act, which limited women's working weeks to 48 hours and their day to eight hours, unconstitutional in 1895. After Governor Altgeld was not re-elected in 1896 and Kelley was removed from her position, flagrant violations of the child labor provision were reported.

The centralized location of Illinois made it a key manufacturing hub, especially for farm machinery and specialty motor vehicles. Smaller Cities like Aurora, Peoria, Decatur, Rockford and other cities became major manufacturing centers in the 20th century. In downstate Illinois, the John Deere Company became one of the world's largest makers of farm machinery, and Caterpillar achieved similar dominance in its diversified line of off-road vehicles.

The Chicago area, meanwhile, began to produce significant quantities of telecommunications gear, electronics, steel, automobiles, and industrial products.

As of 2004, the leading manufacturing industries in Illinois, based upon value-added, were chemical manufacturing ($16.6 billion), food manufacturing ($14.4 billion), machinery manufacturing ($13.6 billion), fabricated metal products ($10.5 billion), plastics and rubber products ($6.8 billion), transportation equipment ($6.7 billion), and computer and electronic products ($6.4 billion).

Renewable energy
Illinois currently ranks second in the Midwest for total installed renewable power capacity and fifth nationally for installed wind power capacity. The renewable energy economy has created 114,000 jobs in Illinois and will continue to see growth after a $15 billion investment from the Future Energy Jobs Act in 2016.

Governor J.B. Pritzker committed Illinois to the U.S. Climate Alliance in 2019 which will further drive economic growth in renewable energy across the state.

Services

By the early 2000s, Illinois's economy had moved toward a dependence on high-value-added services such as financial trading, higher education, logistics, and medicine. In some cases, these services clustered around institutions that hearkened back to Illinois's earlier economies. For example, the Chicago Mercantile Exchange, a trading exchange for global derivatives, had begun its life as an agricultural futures market.

In the late 2010s, the Chicago Metropolitan Area continued to lead the nation in luring corporate relocations or expanded corporate facilities.

Tourism
In 2018, Illinois set a new tourism record with 117 million tourists which represented a 3 million person increase from the previous year. Visitors spent nearly $42 billion in spending the same year.

Flash index
The Institute of Government and Public Affairs at the University of Illinois at Urbana–Champaign publishes a "flash-index" that aims to measure expected economic growth in Illinois. The indicators used are corporate earnings, consumer spending and personal income. These indicators are measured through tax receipts, adjusted for inflation. 100 is the base, so a number above 100 represents growth in the Illinois economy, and a number below 100 represents a shrinking economy. Data from the index, from 6/1981 to the present, can be found here.

See also
Economy of Chicago
Great Lakes Megalopolis

References